John Sterne was appointed Bishop of Colchester to deputise within the Diocese of Ely under the provisions of the Suffragan Bishops Act 1534 in 1592 and held the post until his death in 1607. Educated at Trinity College, Cambridge and ordained in 1554 he was Rector of Stevenage at St Nicholas' Church, then Rickmansworth before his Consecration at All Saints Church, Fulham.

Notes

16th-century Church of England bishops
17th-century Church of England bishops
1607 deaths
Year of birth unknown
Alumni of Trinity College, Cambridge
16th-century births
Bishops of Colchester